An uncollected story written by J. D. Salinger, "The Long Debut of Lois Taggett" is the tale of a debutante and her long process of coming out. Throughout this story, Lois struggles to deal with the harshness of reality and maintain her own humanity. Before she can let go of pretense, she must first deal with a psychotic husband, a loveless second marriage, and her child's crib death. It was first published in the September 1942 edition of Story.

References

1942 short stories
Short stories by J. D. Salinger